Rui Goethe da Costa Falcão (born 26 November 1943, in Pitangui) is a Brazilian politician, former president of the Workers' Party (Partido dos Trabalhadores) and current Federal Deputy representing the state of São Paulo. He also served as the President of the Workers' Party in 1994 and was elected again president of the party to the terms 2011–2013, 2013-2015 and 2015–2017. Preceded senator Gleisi Hoffmann, who took office on 3 June 2017. He was the Secretary of Government of São Paulo during Marta Suplicy's administration.

References

1943 births
Living people
Workers' Party (Brazil) politicians
Presidents of the Workers' Party (Brazil)
Government ministers of Brazil
People from Minas Gerais
University of São Paulo alumni